Gastrodin is a chemical compound which is the glucoside of gastrodigenin. It has been isolated from the orchid Gastrodia elata and from the rhizome of Galeola faberi. It can also be produced by biotransformation of 4-hydroxybenzaldehyde by Datura tatula cell cultures.

G. elata is a herb used in traditional Chinese medicine to treat headache, and it is standardized in the Chinese Pharmacopoeia by gastrodin and gastrodigenin content. In line with this traditional use, gastrodin and its acetyl derivative are used in China as an over-the-counter drug to treat neurasthenia, headache, and migraine. It is available as a dietary supplement in other countries.

A Chinese literature review considers it useful for a range of central nervous system disorders, with the evidence coming from mostly Chinese researches.

References 

Phenol glucosides
Orchids